People Who Fell from the Sky is the third and final studio album by American rock band Mind Funk.

Track listing
 "Rift Valley Fever – 4:22"
 "Superchief – 4:55"
 "Seasick – 4:55"
 "Deep End – 4:28"
 "People Who Fell from the Sky – 3:17"
 "Weird Water – 3:01"
 "Aluna – 6:18"
 "1000 Times – 3:47"
 "Kill the Messenger – 5:40"
 "Acrobats Falling – 5:41"

Personnel 
 Patrick Dubar – lead vocals
 Louis Svitek – guitars, backing vocals
 Frank Ciampi – bass
 Shawn Johnson – drums
 Van Christie – producer

References

Mind Funk albums
1995 albums